3000 Feet High is the debut studio album by Australian singer-songwriter and music producer Paul Mac. It was released in August 2001 and peaked at No. 29 in Australia. It was nominated for three ARIA Music Awards and won one.

Reception
In the Mix said 3000 Feet High is "a feast of eclectic sounds with its machinery-like clicks and beeps. It's quirky and funky and something that stays with you."

Track listing
CD

Charts

Accreditation

ARIA Awards
The ARIA Music Awards are presented annually from 1987 by the Australian Recording Industry Association (ARIA).

|-
|rowspan="3"| 2002 || 3000 Feet High  || Best Dance Release || 
|-
|| 3000 Feet High || Best Male Artist  || 
|-
|| 3000 Feet High || Engineer of the Year  ||

References

2001 debut albums
ARIA Award-winning albums
Eleven: A Music Company albums